Mateusz Śniegocki (born 3 January 1985 in Poznan) is a Polish professional pool player. Śniegocki is a former 10-Ball European champion and three-time winner of events at the Euro Tour.

Career
Śniegocki started playing billiards in a club called "Hades" in 1999, winning 5 national junior titles before 2005. Śniegocki won his first Euro Tour event in 2013 at the Bosnia & Herzegovina Open, before winning the 10-Ball event at the European Pool Championships later that year. In following years, Śniegocki won two more Euro Tour events, the 2015 Portugal Open, and the 2016 Albanian Open.

Achievements
 Kremlin Cup (2012)
 Euro Tour
 Bosnia & Herzegovina Open (2013)
 Portugal Open (2015)
 Albanian Open (2016)
 European Pool Championship
 Ten-ball (2013, 2019, 2021)
 Polish Pool Championship
 Eight-ball (2006)
 Nine-ball (2005, 2006, 2009)

References

External links

Polish pool players
Living people
Sportspeople from Poznań
1985 births